The Men's slalom competition of the Albertville 1992 Olympics was held at Les Ménuires.

The defending world champion was Marc Girardelli of Luxembourg, who was also the defending World Cup slalom champion, while Alberto Tomba was the leader of the 1992 World Cup.

Results

References 

Men's slalom
Winter Olympics